The masked finch (Poephila personata) is a small passerine bird in the estrildid finch family, Estrildidae. It is a common resident of dry savannah across northern Australia, from the Kimberley, across the Top End, the Gulf country and the southern part of Cape York Peninsula, as far east as Chillagoe, but always near water.

Description
The masked finch is 12.5–13.5 cm long. The male is larger, but the sexes are otherwise similar. It is cinnamon-brown above and paler below with a white rump, black mark on the flanks and black face mask. It has a heavy yellow bill and a pointed black tail. The eastern subspecies P. p. leucotis has whitish cheeks.

Behaviour
Pairs or small flocks of masked finches forage through the day, mostly on the ground for grass seeds. In the evenings and early mornings, large numbers—sometimes thousands— can gather around waterholes to drink, cleanse, and preen, flicking their tails sideways and chattering incessantly.

Pairs build a domed nest from grasses, lined with fine grass, feathers, and charcoal, in the late wet or early dry season. The nest position varies: it can be as high as 20 metres or simply hidden in long grass. Five to six white eggs are laid.

Origin
Origin and phylogeny has been obtained by Antonio Arnaiz-Villena et al. Estrildinae may have originated in India and dispersed thereafter (towards Africa and Pacific Ocean habitats).

References

BirdLife International (2008) Species factsheet: Poephila personata. Downloaded from http://www.birdlife.org on 5 August 2008.
Clement, Peter; Harris, Alan & Davies, John (1993) Finches and Sparrows: An Identification Guide, Christopher Helm, London.
Pizzey, Graham & Knight, Frank (1997) Birds of Australia, HarperCollins, London.

masked finch
masked finch
Birds of the Northern Territory
Birds of Cape York Peninsula
Endemic birds of Australia
masked finch